U.S. Route 83 (US 83) is a major north–south United States Numbered Highway that extends  in the central United States. Only four other north–south routes are longer: US 1, US 41, US 59, and US 87, while US 83 follows a straighter north-south path than all of these. Nearly half of its mileage is in the state of Texas. The highway's northern terminus is north of Westhope, North Dakota, at the Canadian border, where it continues as Manitoba Highway 83 (PTH 83). The southern terminus is at the Veterans International Bridge in Brownsville, Texas.  Together, US 83 and PTH 83 form a continuously numbered north-south highway with a combined distance of 3,450 kilometres (2,140 mi).

Despite its length it has very few concurrencies with interstate highways. Due to the sparse population and primarily rural routing, no segments have been decommissioned. If the road were ever upgraded to interstate status, no numbers in the proper sequence would be available as the route is between I-27 and I-29.

Route description

Texas

US 83 is a largely north–south highway,  in length, in Texas except for a segment parallel to the Rio Grande, where it takes an east–west course, much of which runs concurrently with Interstate 2 (I-2). It enters the United States and Texas near Brownsville concurrent with US 77 and then splits from US 77 at Harlingen. Passing Weslaco with I-2, it begins to veer northward and passes the current western terminus of I-2 at Peñitas, follows the Rio Grande to Laredo where it meets I-35 in a  concurrency before heading northwestward. It meets I-10 at Junction, where it has a  concurrency with I-10, before heading almost due-north to Abilene, meeting I-20 on an expressway before heading north again on mostly undivided surface roads. It again heads slightly west of due north to meet US 287 in Childress and I-40 in Shamrock. Except for Abilene, Laredo, and some cities in the lower Rio Grande Valley it is largely rural in nature.

Oklahoma

US 83 traverses the Oklahoma panhandle along the western border of Beaver County, but in this brief  stretch it encounters no fewer than three other federal highways. Approximately  from the Texas line, US 83 intersects US 412 in the hamlet of Bryan's Corner. Continuing its journey northward, the highway crosses the Beaver River, then intersects US 64 in Turpin. US 83 north and US 64 east are co-signed for three northbound miles, where US 64 turns eastward. At this intersection, US 270 west joins the highway, and together with US 83 proceeds northbound for the final  to the Kansas line.

Kansas

North of Liberal, US 83 begins a concurrency with US 160, and the highways remain joined until reaching Sublette, the seat of Haskell County. US 83 and US 160 split north of Sublette; US 160 heads west toward Ulysses, and US 83 continues north toward Garden City.

At Garden City, US 50 and US 400 join US 83 for a brief concurrency on a bypass around the east and north sides of the city while US 83 Business follows the former routing through downtown. All three routes cross K-156, also known as Kansas Avenue, in the northwest portion of the city. At the north end of the US 50/US 83 Business route, US 83 splits and heads north toward Scott City, while US 50 and US 400 remain joined through the rest of the state. The highway passes through largely unpopulated areas of Finney County and Scott County before reaching a junction with K-96 in downtown Scott City.

In northern Scott County, K-4 has its origins at US-83, heading east toward Healy, and US-83 traverses through rolling farmlands until reaching Oakley, the seat of Logan County. US-83 reaches US-40 less than a mile west of I-70, and the two highways jog west for a brief multiplex before US-83 splits and crosses I-70.

North of I-70, US-83 intersects US-24 then curves northeast, east of Gem in Thomas County. US-83 continues its northeasterly track through Rexford and Selden. After passing through Selden, US-83 intersects the southern terminus of K-383 and the northern terminus of K-23. From here, US-83 turns north, crosses into Decatur County then continues north and intersects US-36 in Oberlin. Oberlin is the last area of significant population the highway passes in Kansas; the next city is McCook, Nebraska.

Nebraska

US 83 enters Nebraska south of McCook, where it meets US 6 and US 34. It continues northward to North Platte, where it intersects I-80 and US 30. After leaving North Platte in a northeasterly direction, it turns north near Thedford and goes north through the Sand Hills to Valentine. For  before Valentine, it runs concurrently with US 20. After passing through Valentine, it continues north to enter South Dakota.

South Dakota

US 83 enters South Dakota south of Olsonville on a segment of highway which passes through the Rosebud Indian Reservation. After a brief overlap with US 18 in Mission, the route turns north and meets I-90 at Murdo. The two routes overlap as US 83 goes east with I-90 until Vivian, where US 83 turns north. At Fort Pierre, US 83 meets US 14 and South Dakota Highway 34. The three highways overlap as they cross the Missouri River and enter Pierre. At Pierre, SD 34 separates and US 83 turns northeast with US 14. They separate near Blunt and US 83 turns northward. US 83 briefly overlaps with US 212 near Gettysburg and with US 12 through the Selby area. US 83 leaves South Dakota north of Herreid.

The South Dakota section of US 83, with the exception of concurrencies with US 18, I-90, US 14, US 212, and US 12, is defined at South Dakota Codified Laws § 31-4-180.

North Dakota

It follows I-94 west to Bismarck, where it resumes a generally northward course as a four-lane highway.

Headed toward Minot US 83 traverses mostly agricultural land, passing through the some small cities such as Wilton, Washburn and Underwood north to Max. Leaving Underwood, US 83 encounters a large strip-mining coal (lignite) operation which can be seen from the roadway in the vicinity of Falkirk. North of Coleharbor, US 83 briefly merges both roadways and shares land with an adjacent railroad line in order to cross a viaduct that separates Lake Sakakawea from Lake Audubon. North of the lakes, the surroundings return to cropland and grazing land, though a wind farm is located south of Minot.

US 83 passes directly through Minot, where it is known as Broadway, although the Minot Bypass to the west is an alternate route. The highway then diverges from ND 5 to head north through Westhope to the Canadian border.

Major intersections 

Texas
  at the Veterans International Bridge at Los Tomates at the Mexico–United States border in Brownsville. US 77/US 83 travels concurrently to Harlingen.
  in Brownsville. The highways travel concurrently to Harlingen.
  in Brownsville
  in Harlingen. I-2/US 83 travels concurrently to north of Abram-Perezville.
  in Pharr
  in Laredo. The highways travel concurrently to Botines.
  in Laredo
  in Carrizo Springs
  in La Pryor
  in Uvalde
  northwest of Segovia. The highways travel concurrently to Junction.
  in Junction. US 83/US 377 travels concurrently to north of Junction.
  in Menard. The highways travel concurrently to north of Menard.
  in Eden
  in Ballinger. The highways travel concurrently through Ballinger.
  east-northeast of Tuscola. The highways travel concurrently to Abilene.
  in Abilene. The highways travel concurrently to north of Anson.
  in Abilene
  in Anson
  in Aspermont. The highways travel concurrently to north-northwest of Aspermont.
  south of Guthrie
  in Paducah. US 62/US 83 travels concurrently to north of Childress.
  in Childress
  in Shamrock
  south-southwest of Canadian. The highways travel concurrently to north-northeast of Canadian.
Oklahoma
  in Bryan's Corner
  south-southeast of Turpin. The highways travel concurrently to north of Turpin.
  north of Turpin. US 83/US 270 travels concurrently to Liberal, Kansas.
Kansas
  in Liberal
  northwest of Kismet. The highways travel concurrently to north-northwest of Sublette.
  southwest of Sublette
  in Garden City. The highways travel concurrently to north-northwest of Garden City.
  in Oakley. The highways travel concurrently through Oakley.
  north-northwest of Oakley
  south-southeast of Gem
  in Oberlin
Nebraska
  in McCook. The highways travel concurrently through McCook.
  in North Platte
  in North Platte
  south-southeast of Valentine. The highways travel concurrently to Valentine.
South Dakota
  in Mission. The highways travel concurrently to west-southwest of Mission.
  southeast of Murdo. The highways travel concurrently to southwest of Vivian.
  in Fort Pierre. The highways travel concurrently to west-southwest of Blunt
  west of Gettysburg.
  south of Selby. The highways travel concurrently to north-northwest of Selby.
North Dakota
  in Sterling. The highways travel concurrently to Bismarck.
  in Minot
  at the Canada–United States border north of Westhope

See also

Related U.S. Routes 
 U.S. Highway 183
 U.S. Highway 283
 U.S. Highway 383 (former)

Related Canadian Routes 
 Manitoba Highway 83

References

Further reading 

  Narrative of a journey along U.S. Route 83 from Swan River, Manitoba to Brownsville, Texas.

External links

Endpoints of U.S. Highway 83

 
United States Numbered Highway System
U.S. Highways in Nebraska
U.S. Highways in South Dakota